Allpajata (possibly from quechua allpa earth, qhata slope, hillside, "earth slope") is mountain in the Carabaya mountain range in the Andes of Peru, about  high. It is located in the Puno Region, Carabaya Province, on the border of the districts of Ituata and Macusani. Allpajata lies northwest of Queroni, and east and southeast of the lake and the mountain named Tocsajota.

References 

Mountains of Puno Region
Mountains of Peru